The Anderson–Doosing Farm is a historic home and farm located near Catawba, Roanoke County, Virginia. The farmhouse was built about 1883, and is a two-story, three-bay, Greek Revival style frame dwelling. It has a two-story rear ell. Also on the property are the contributing meat house, log cabin, equipment shed / blacksmith shop, two chicken houses, barn (c. 1830), privy (c. 1940), corn crib, and milking parlor (c. 1940).

It was added to the National Register of Historic Places in 2009.

References

Houses on the National Register of Historic Places in Virginia
Farms on the National Register of Historic Places in Virginia
Greek Revival houses in Virginia
Houses completed in 1883
Houses in Roanoke County, Virginia
National Register of Historic Places in Roanoke County, Virginia